Bani Sirhah is a sub-district located in Al Makhadir District, Ibb Governorate, Yemen. Bani Sirhah had a population of  21493 as of 2004.

References 

Sub-districts in Al Makhadir District